A59 may refer to:

 A59 road, a road connecting Liverpool and York in England
 A59 motorway (Netherlands), a road connecting Willemstad and Oss
 One of the Encyclopaedia of Chess Openings codes for the Benko Gambit in chess